Bom Sucesso may refer to:

Places

Brazil
 Bom Sucesso, Minas Gerais, municipality in the state of Minas Gerais.
 Bom Sucesso, Paraíba, municipality in the state of Paraíba.
 Bom Sucesso, Paraná, municipality in the state of Paraná.
 Bom Sucesso do Sul, municipality in the state of Paraná.
 Bom Sucesso de Itararé, municipality in the state of São Paulo.

Portugal
 Bom Sucesso (Alverca), a civil parish in the municipality of Alverca
 Bom Sucesso (Figueira da Foz), a civil parish in the municipality of Figueira da Foz

Others 
 Bom Sucesso (TV series), a 2019 Brazilian telenovela.